The Australian prowfishes are a small family, the Pataecidae, of ray-finned fishes classified within the order Scorpaeniformes. Australian prowfishes are distinguished by a long dorsal fin that begins far forward on the head, forming a "prow" shape, and extends all the way to the caudal fin. They lack scales and pelvic fins.

Taxonomy
The Australian prowfishes were first recognised as a family in 1872 by the American biologist Theodore Gill with the type species of the family being Pataecus fronto which had been described by John Richardson in 1844. The 5th edition of Fishes of the World classifies the family within the suborder Scorpaenoidei which in turn is classified within the order Scorpaeniformes. Other authorities place the Scorpaenoidei within the Perciformes. A recent study placed this family into an expanded stonefish clade, Synanceiidae, because all of these fish have a lachrymal sabre that can project a switch-blade-like mechanism out from underneath their eye. The name of the family comes from the genus name of the type species Pataecus, which is derived from Pataikos, a strangely shaped dwarf-like Phoenician deity which was used as a figurehead on the prows of ships.

Genera
The Australian prowfishes are classified into three monotypic genera:

 Aetapcus E.O.G. Scott, 1936
 Neopataecus Steindachner, 1884
 Pataecus Richardson, 1844

Characteristics
The Australian prowfishes are unusual scorpeanoids which have a compressed triangular body and a long, undivided dorsal fin which has its origin on the head to the front of the eyes. They do not have pelvic fins and there are no scales on their body but in one species the body is covered in papillae.  There are 19-25 spines and 7-17 soft rays in the dorsal fin and 5-11 spines and 3-7 soft rays in the anal fin. The pectoral fin has 8 rays and all of the fin rays are unbranched. There is a fleshy extendion on the front of the isthmus.

Distribution and habitat
Australian prowfishes are endemic to the coastal waters of southern Australia. Here they are associated with sponge and algal beds on rocky habitats.

References

Pataecidae
Scorpaenoidei
Taxa named by Theodore Gill